The 1976 United States presidential election in Mississippi was held on November 2, 1976. The Democratic Party candidate Jimmy Carter won the state of Mississippi. He narrowly won the state with 49.56% of the vote, and all 7 of the state's electors were pledged to Carter.

In the 1972 election, Mississippi had the strongest showing of Richard Nixon in the country, with Nixon carrying 78% of the vote. Carter managed to carry Mississippi in 1976 by a slim margin of 1.88% against incumbent Republican President Gerald Ford. At that time, excluding the wins of Strom Thurmond in 1948, the unpledged electors who voted for Harry F. Byrd in 1960, Barry Goldwater in 1964, George Wallace in 1968, and Nixon in 1972, Carter’s performance in Mississippi was the worst for a post-Reconstruction Democratic presidential candidate, as he failed to win a majority of the vote. While Carter performed well in northern Mississippi and in black majority counties along the Mississippi River, President Ford’s wins in Hinds County (Jackson) and neighboring Rankin County, both of which were won with over sixty percent of the vote, along with a substantial win in Harrison County (Biloxi and Gulfport), kept the race in Mississippi extremely close.

, this is the last time a Democrat won the state of Mississippi, as well as Hancock County, Neshoba County, DeSoto County, Carroll County, Covington County, Pearl River County, George County, Wayne County, Stone County, Greene County, Perry County, and Webster County.

Results

Results by county

References

Mississippi
1976 Mississippi elections
1976